All Turtles is an AI startup studio based in San Francisco, Paris, and Tokyo. It "specializes in developing practical AI products.".

History 
All Turtles was founded in June 2017 by Phil Libin, Jon Cifuentes, and Jessica Collier

Model
The All Turtles startup studio focuses on practical AI (artificial intelligence) and works with founders to build AI products that "solve vexing everyday problems." Rather than emphasize company building, it was founded with a "product-first" spirit, based on Libin's observation that "few visionaries are primarily motivated by making a company."

Based on the model of Hollywood studios, All Turtles gives AI entrepreneurs support and distribution so they are able to "focus on creating a new product rather than starting a new company for each new product.”

For its studio teams, All Turtles provides entrepreneurs with "funding and resources such as engineers and working spaces." Studio teams are supported by in-house staff from a variety of professional fields, including legal, IP, product design, visual design, illustration, branding, copywriting, content & editorial strategy, partnerships & business development, fundraising, market research, HR, and operations.

All Turtles has publicly announced plans to establish locations across the globe "to capture ideas Silicon Valley would miss from people who are not white, male Stanford grads—and to help transform economies in places like Memphis and Buffalo."

References 

Companies based in San Francisco
Technology companies established in 2017
2017 establishments in California